The 1946 Paris–Roubaix was the 44th edition of the Paris–Roubaix, a classic one-day cycle race in France. The single day event was held on 21 April 1946 and stretched  from Paris to the finish at Roubaix Velodrome. The winner was Georges Claes from Belgium.

Results

References

Paris–Roubaix
Paris–Roubaix
Paris–Roubaix
Paris–Roubaix